The Bridgend Designer Outlet, also known as McArthurGlen Designer Outlet (and known locally as "The Pines") is a commercial retail park and outlet store development in Bridgend, Wales, United Kingdom. It is owned and operated by McArthurGlen Group.

History
The development is situated on Junction 36 of the M4 motorway between Cardiff and Swansea. It consists of around ninety different stores which offer discounts off brand and designer labels.  An array of goods are available including clothes, toys, books and electrical products.

In 2014 the Outlet underwent a makeover and five new stores opened in 2015, including Ernest Jones, Calvin Klein, Henri Lloyd, Le Creuset and Snow + Rock. The outlet's facelift cost £2.5million.

Accessibility
The Designer Outlet is located near the villages of Sarn, Litchard and Pen-y-fai and the town of Bridgend. Adjacent to the development are a Sainsbury's supermarket, a Harvester restaurant, a Premier Inn hotel, a Joules clothing store and a KFC restaurant which was previously located in the food court until 2012.

It is also served by a number of bus routes to destinations both north and south of the village to and from the town of Bridgend and the Llynfi, Garw and Ogmore Valleys and has a bus stop which is served by National Express and TrawsCambria coaches between Swansea and Cardiff.

References

External links
Bridgend Designer Outlet website

Shopping centres in Wales
Outlet malls in Wales
Buildings and structures in Bridgend
Tourist attractions in Bridgend County Borough